Bitter end or The Bitter End may refer to:

Bitter end, the part of a rope used to form a knot
The Bitter End, a nightclub in New York City

Geography
Bitter End, Tennessee
Bitter End, Virgin Gorda

Arts, entertainment, and media

Literature
To the Bitter End. The English translation of Bis zum bitteren Ende, the first-hand account of the German resistance by Hans Bernd Gisevius
Bitter End (novella), a 1940 Nero Wolfe mystery novella by Rex Stout
"The Bitter End" (short story), an alternative history mystery story by Randall Garrett

Music

Albums
The Bitter End (Red Flag album), 2002
The Bitter End (Right Away, Great Captain album)

Songs
"Bitter End" (song), by Nine Black Alps
"Bitter End", by Rag'n'Bone Man
"A Bitter End", by Deryl Dodd
"The Bitter End" (song), by Placebo
"The Bitter End", by Stone Sour from Audio Secrecy
"The Bitter End", by Sum 41 from Chuck

See also
"Bitters End", a 1972 song by Roxy Music